De Grasse may refer to:

People 
 Andre De Grasse (born 1994), Canadian sprinter
 François Joseph Paul de Grasse (1722–1788), French admiral who helped George Washington during the siege of Yorktown in the American Revolutionary War
 Joseph De Grasse (1873–1940), film director
 Sam De Grasse (1875–1953), actor
 Neil deGrasse Tyson (1958), astrophysicist
 Leland DeGrasse (born 1945/1946), a judge

Ships 
Named in honour of Admiral De Grasse:

French Navy

French Merchant Marine
  - French passenger liner built by Cammell, Laid & Company Ltd in Birkenhead, England for the French line Compagnie Générale Transatlantique

US Navy

See also

 
 
 
 
 
Grasse (disambiguation)